This list of Le Corbusier buildings categorizes the work of the architect.

Le Corbusier Unbuilt Projects
These countries are listed in chronological order.

Switzerland 
1910   School of arts and crafts, La Chaux-de-Fonds.
1914   Dom-ino House (no site agreed).
1914  Felix Klipstein house, Loubach.
1914  Bank, Neuenburg.
1915  Butin bridge, near Geneva (Competition).
1916   Watch factory, la Chaux-de-Fonds.
1926   League of Nations headquarters, Geneva.
1928   Wanner apartment block, Geneva.
1929   World Museum, Geneva.
1932   Apartment block, Zurichhorn, Zurich. 
1933   Rentenanstalt building, Zurich. 
1934   Workers housing, Zurich.
1950   Feuter House, Lake Constance.
1962   Centre Le Corbusier, Zurich (First version).

France 
1914  Norman House, Deauville.
1915  House at Lons-sur-Saunier.
 1916-21 Paul Poiret House.
1916   Fritz Zbinden House, Erlach.
1916   Administrative building, Le Locle.
1917   Abattoir, Challuy and Garchizy.
1917   Workers housing, near Dieppe.
1917   Dam, l'ile Jourdain.
1918   Factory, Saintes.
1918   Workers housing.
1919   Pre-cast concrete houses, Troyes.
 1919    Monol Hou1934   Apartment block, Esplanade des Invalides, Paris.
1935   Bata works at Hellocourt, Lorraine.ses (no site agreed).
1919   Distillery, near Lyons.
 1920    Citrohan House (1st version) (No site agreed).
1921   Garage, Lille.
 1922    Citrohan House (2nd version) (no site agreed) (exhibition model built).
1922   La Roche- Jeanneret houses, Auteuil.
 1922    Artists house.
1924   Weekend house at Rambouillet (exhibition model built).
1925   Meyer House, Paris.
1925   Housing, Cite Audincourt.
1926   Raspail garage, Paris.
1926   Cardinet stadium, Paris.
1926   Fruges factory.
1931   Museum of contemporary arts, Paris.1939   Research Laboratory, Roscoff, France.
1935   Apartment block, rue Fabert, Paris. 
1935   Bastion Kellermann, Paris.
1935   Museum, Paris.
1936   National Sports Centre, Paris.
1936    Bata shops.
1937   Monument to Vaillant-Couturier, Villejuif.
1937   Jaoul weekend house.
1937   Bata pavilion, International exhibition Paris.
1939   Sports centre, Vars valley.
1940   Murondins housing for war refugees (various sites)
1940   Pre-fabricated schools (various sites) (with Jean Prouve).
1940   Pre-fabricated housing.
1940   Foremans House.
1940   Engineers House.
1948   Roq & Rob housing, Cap Martin.
1950   Museum of endless growth (no specific site).
1950   Exhibition Pavilion, Port Mailllot, Paris.
1950   Delgado Memorial chapel.
1950   Two Unite d'Habitations at Strasbourg.
1950   Chastang dam.
1957   Five Unite d'Habitation at Meaux.
1959   Pre-fabricated housing (with Renault enhineers) (site unknown). 
1961   Conference centre and hotel, Quai Anatole France.
1962   Saint Pierre church, Firmany Vert (first version).  
1964   Congress Hall, Strasbourg.
1965   Museum of the 20th century, Nanterre, Paris

Morocco 
1919   Hotel, Rabat.

Chile 
1930   Errazuris house, Chile.

Russia 
1931   Palace of the Soviets, Moscow (competition).

Algeria 
1933   Durand Housing, Algeria.
1933   Apartment block, Algiers.
1935   Apartment block, Nemours, Algeria.
1935   Swimming pool with wave machine, Badjarah, Algeria.
1938   Tower for Quartier de la Marine, Algeria.
1939   Museum of endless growth, Philippeville, Algeria.
1942    Peyrissac House, Cherchal, Algeria

Czechoslovakia 
1935   Bata Works at Zlin Valley, Czechoslovakia.

United States 
1935   house for a College president, Chicago, Ill.

1939   Exhibition pavilion, Liege or San Francisco.

Brazil 
1936   University, Rio de Janeiro.

1964   French Embassy, Brasilia.

United Kingdom 
1936    Paul Bowlard House, Little Dole, Sussex, UK
1939   Ideal Home exhibition pavilion, London.

India 
1952   Workers houses, Chandigarh
1953   Governors palace, Chandigarh.
1956   Prefabricated housing, Lagny (with Jean Prouve).
1956   Hospital, Flers.
1960   Museum of Knowledge, Chandigarh.

Iraq 
1956   Sports Centre, Baghdad.

Sweden 
1962   Ahrenberg Exhibition Pavilion, Stockholm.

Germany 
1963   International Art Centre, Erlenbach, near Frankfurt upon Main.

Italy 
1962   Olivetti Computer Centre, Rho-Milan (first version)

1963   Church, Bologna for Archbishop Lercaro.

1963   Olivetti Computer Centre, Rho-Milan.

1964   Hospital Venice (first version).

1965   Hospital Venice (revised version).

References

External links
 Le Corbusier Foundation: List of buildings
 Model for the Villa Chimanbhai
 Le Corbusier and Villa Cook

 
Le Corbusier